

The Caspar C 35 Priwall (for the Priwall Peninsula) was a German airliner of the late 1920s, of which only a single example was built. It was a large, single-engine, single-bay biplane of conventional configuration with fixed tailskid undercarriage. The staggered, equal-span wings were braced with a large I-strut. Not only were the passengers seated within a fully enclosed cabin, but the flight deck was fully enclosed as well.

The sole C 35 was operated by Deutsche Luft Hansa, christened Rostock. It was destroyed in July 1930.

Specifications

References

Further reading

External links
 German Aircraft Between 1919-1945

C035
Biplanes
Single-engined tractor aircraft
1920s German airliners